Music for Prancing is an album by saxophonist Warne Marsh recorded in 1957 and originally released on the Mode label.

Reception 

The Allmusic review noted "With a reputation as one of the originators of cool jazz, it's ironic that over the years tenor saxophonist Warne Marsh gained a following of musicians mainly associated with the avant-garde, spearheaded by multi-reedist Anthony Braxton. These musicians heard what this disc demonstrates: that cool didn't always mean smoothed out".

Track listing 
 "You Are Too Beautiful" (Richard Rodgers, Lorenz Hart) – 5:30
 "Autumn in New York" (Vernon Duke) – 4:58
 "Playa del Ray" (Warne Marsh) – 4:59
 "Ad Libido" (Ronnie Ball) – 4:24
 "Everything Happens to Me" (Matt Dennis, Tom Adair) – 6:41
 "It's All Right with Me" (Cole Porter) – 4:15

Personnel 
Warne Marsh – tenor saxophone
Ronnie Ball – piano
Red Mitchell – bass
Stan Levey – drums

References 

Warne Marsh albums
1957 albums